Jonathan Manton from the University of Melbourne, Parkville, VIC, Australia was named Fellow of the Institute of Electrical and Electronics Engineers (IEEE) in 2016 for contributions to geometric methods in signal processing and wireless communications.

References 

Fellow Members of the IEEE
Living people
Australian electrical engineers
Year of birth missing (living people)